The 1951 All-American Girls Professional Baseball League season marked the ninth season of the circuit. The teams Battle Creek Belles, Fort Wayne Daisies, Grand Rapids Chicks, Kalamazoo Lassies, Kenosha Comets, Peoria Redwings, Rockford Peaches and South Bend Blue Sox competed through a 112-game schedule, while the Shaugnessy playoffs featured the top four teams from each half of the regular season.

In 1951, many things changed in relation to the previous season, when attendance began to decline dramatically. The Racine Belles franchise was moved to Battle Creek, Michigan, while the Chicago Colleens and Springfield Sallies traveling teams were disbanded. Betty Foss of Fort Wayne led all hitters for the second year in a row with a .368 batting average, breaking her own single-season record of .346 set in her rookie season. Foss also topped the league with 34 doubles, setting an all-time single-season record that would never be surpassed. Nine pitchers recorded an earned run average below 2.00, while Rose Gacioch of Rockford was the only one to gain 20 victories during the year. The Player of the Year Award was given to South Bend pitcher Jean Faut, who posted a 15–7 record with a 1.33 ERA and a league-leading 135 strikeouts, including a perfect game against Rockford on July 21 of that season.

During the best-of-three series, first-place South Bend defeated third-place Fort Wayne, two games to one, while second-place Grand Rapids swept fourth-place Rockford in two games. South Bend pitching star Jean Faut drove in a run and held Fort Wayne to a run in Game 1, and later struck out nine batters and allowed one run in Game 3 to advance to the finals. In the other series, Rockford's Helen Nicol gave up six hits and shut out Grand Rapids in the first contest, while Marie Mansfield hurled a 7–6, 11-inning victory to defeat the Chicks.

The final series took all five games to decide the champion team.  Rockford held a 2–0 advantage in the series and looked to take it all, but South Bend rebounded and won the last three games to clinch the title. In Game 3, Faut stopped the Peaches in their tracks, pitching a six-hit, 3–2 victory, and picked up the win in a seven-inning relief effort in Game 5 to continue her winning ways. South Bend batted a collective .275 average in the finals, with Jane Stoll leading the offense with a .333 average (6-for-18) and six RBI, while Senaida Wirth batted .412 (7-for-17) and scored four runs, and Betty Wagoner hit .389 (7-for-18) with five runs.

In 1951, the AAGPBL attendance declined for the third straight year. As revenues fell, individual teams' funds were limited to advertise nationally as a way of recruiting scattered baseball talent. With no centralized control of publicity, promotion, rookie training teams, and equalization of player talent, the League began to break down. The Kenosha and Peoria franchises withdrew at the end of the year, leaving the league with six teams for the next season.

Standings

First half

Second half

Overall

Postseason

Batting statistics

Pitching statistics

All-Star Game

See also
1951 Major League Baseball season
1951 Nippon Professional Baseball season

Sources

External links
AAGPBL Official Website
AAGPBL Records
Baseball Historian files
The Diamond Angle profiles and interviews
SABR Projects – Jim Sargent articles
YouTube videos

All-American Girls Professional Baseball League seasons
1950s in women's baseball
1951 in baseball
All